This Index of ethics articles puts articles relevant to well-known ethical (right and wrong, good and bad) debates and decisions in one place - including practical problems long known in philosophy, and the more abstract subjects in law, politics, and some professions and sciences. It lists also those core concepts essential to understanding ethics as applied in various religions, some movements derived from religions, and religions discussed as if they were a theory of ethics making no special claim to divine status.

A

B

C

D

E

F

G

H

I

J

K

L

M

N

O

P

Q

R

S

T

U

V

W

See also
 Outline of ethics
 Philosophy
 Morality

Ethics lists
Ethics articles